Hendrik Human Dippenaar (born 14 June 1977), known as Boeta Dippenaar, is a former South African cricketer who played all formats of the game. He is also a member of ACA African XI. He has played as a specialist batsman in most of his matches, and has played Test cricket in all batting positions from one through seven. He bats right-handed and bowls occasional off breaks.

In January 2008 Dippenaar retired from international cricket at the age of 30 to concentrate on improving his qualifications for life after cricket. He finished his career with a high average of 42.23 in ODIs for South Africa.

International career
Dippenaar made his international debut in September 1999, playing two of South Africa's four One Day Internationals as an opening batsman during the LG Cup in Kenya, which South Africa won, and he also played both Tests in the home-and-away Test series with Zimbabwe in October and November that same month, making 56 runs in four innings.

He was in and out of both the Test and One Day International team during the next five years, never playing more than eight Tests in succession, but during the tour of the West Indies in 2004–05 Dippenaar's form showed signs of improving. He was selected for two Tests against the West Indies, recording two fifties in three innings, and subsequently averaged 105.66 in the 5-ODI series against the West Indies.

However, he made four sub-25 scores in his next ODIs, before a wrist injury ruled him out of the remaining four matches against New Zealand and the tour of India in November. By December, Dippenaar had recovered, and he turned out for the Eagles in three Standard Bank Cup matches in that month, scoring 49 runs in his three innings. The South African selectors did, however, call on him for the one-day leg of the tour of Australia, which included the VB Series.

References

External links
 

1977 births
Living people
Cricketers from Kimberley, Northern Cape 
South African cricketers
Afrikaner people
South Africa Twenty20 International cricketers
South Africa One Day International cricketers
Cricketers at the 2003 Cricket World Cup
ACA African XI One Day International cricketers
South Africa Test cricketers
Free State cricketers
Knights cricketers
Leicestershire cricketers